The Little City of Rocks Wilderness Study Area is a Bureau of Land Management wilderness study area in Gooding County, Idaho between the towns of Gooding and Fairfield. The WSA can be accessed via a short dirt road from Idaho State Highway 46. The WSA is located on the Bennett Hills and features a collection of rock features called hoodoos, which cover about 34% of the WSA. The Little City of Rocks WSA is contiguous (but divided by dirt roads) with three other WSAs in the Bennett Hills: Black Canyon, Gooding City of Rocks East, and Gooding City of Rocks West. Portions of the WSA's borders are formed by dirt roads, which also separates it from the Black Canyon WSA.

Sagebrush and grasses are the dominant vegetation in the WSA, although there is a small grove of quaking aspen on a north-facing slope on the WSA's northern edge. Wildlife that can be found in the WSA include elk, mule deer, coyote, and various birds of prey and upland game. The WSA was not recommended to be included as part of the National Wilderness Preservation System because greater wilderness values can be found in the Gooding City of Rocks East and West WSAs. But the area will remain a WSA until it is released or designated a wilderness area.

References

Protected areas of Gooding County, Idaho
Protected areas established in 1992
Bureau of Land Management areas in Idaho
1992 establishments in Idaho